This is a list of provincial parks in Eastern Ontario. These provincial parks are maintained by Ontario Parks. For a list of other provincial parks in Ontario, see the List of provincial parks in Ontario.

Ontario
Provincial parks, Eastern Ontario
Provincial parks in Canada
Eastern Ontario